Homeobox protein SIX1 (Sine oculis homeobox homolog 1) is a protein that in humans is encoded by the SIX1 gene.

Function 

The vertebrate SIX genes are homologs of the Drosophila 'sine oculis' (so) gene, which is expressed primarily in the developing visual system of the fly. Members of the SIX gene family encode proteins that are characterized by a divergent DNA-binding homeodomain and an upstream SIX domain, which may be involved both in determining DNA-binding specificity and in mediating protein–protein interactions. Genes in the SIX family have been shown to play roles in vertebrate and insect development or have been implicated in maintenance of the differentiated state of tissues.[supplied by OMIM]

Interactions 

SIX1 has been shown to interact with EYA1, DACH, GRO and MDFI.

References

Further reading 

 
 
 
 
 
 
 
 
 
 
 
 
 
 
 
 
 

Transcription factors